Elizabeth Carroll Wingo (born 1970) is an associate judge of the Superior Court of the District of Columbia.

Education and career 

Wingo earned her Bachelor of Arts from Dartmouth College in 1992 and her Juris Doctor from Yale Law School in 1997.

After law school, she worked as an associate in Washington office of Sullivan and Cromwell. From 1998 to 1999, she clerked for Judge T.S. Ellis, III of the United States District Court for the Eastern District of Virginia. From 1999 to 2004, she was an assistant United States attorney at the United States Attorney's Office in the District of Columbia. From 2004 to 2006, she served as chief of the criminal section in the Office of the Attorney General for the District of Columbia, and in 2006, she served as the assistant deputy attorney general for Public Safety.

D.C. superior court 

On August 18, 2006, Chief Judge Rufus G. King III appointed Wingo as a magistrate judge of the Superior Court of the District of Columbia.

On November 30, 2015, President Barack Obama nominated Wingo to a 15-year term as an associate judge on the same court. On March 2, 2016, the Senate Committee on Homeland Security and Governmental Affairs held a hearing on her nomination. On April 25, 2016, the Committee reported her nomination favorably to the senate floor. On June 23, 2016, the Senate confirmed her nomination by voice vote.

Personal life 

Wingo is married to Harry Wingo and they have two daughters Alexandra and Natalie.

References

1970 births
Living people
20th-century American women lawyers
20th-century American lawyers
21st-century American judges
21st-century American women lawyers
21st-century American lawyers
21st-century American women judges
Assistant United States Attorneys
Dartmouth College alumni
Harvard Law School alumni
Judges of the Superior Court of the District of Columbia
Lawyers from Washington, D.C.